The Diocese of Fredericton is a diocese of the Ecclesiastical Province of Canada of the Anglican Church of Canada. Established in 1845, its first bishop was John Medley, who served until his death on September 9, 1892. Its cathedral and diocesan offices are in Fredericton, New Brunswick, Canada.

Bishops
 1845–1892: John Medley; Metropolitan of Canada, 1879–1892
 1892–1907: Tully Kingdon
 1907–1938: John Richardson; Metropolitan of Canada, 1934–1938
 1939–1956: William Moorhead
 1957–1971: Henry O'Neil
 1971–1989: Harold Nutter; Metropolitan of Canada, 1980–1989
 1989–2000: George Lemmon
 2000–2003: Bill Hockin
 2003–2014: Claude Miller; Metropolitan of Canada, 2009–2014
 2014–present: David Edwards; Metropolitan of Canada, 2020–Present

Archdeacons

The following have served as archdeacons of the diocese:

Archdeacons of St. Andrews
 2001–2003: Geoffrey Hall
 2014–present: John Matheson

Archdeacons of Chatham
 2018–2020: Sandy MacPherson
 2020–present: Perry Cooper

Archdeacons of Fredericton
George Best held this post 1825–1829 in the Diocese of Nova Scotia, before the erection of Fredericton diocese; Best and Coster were archdeacons for all New Brunswick, and as such were also called Archdeacon of New Brunswick.
1829?: George Coster
in 1866, there was one archdeaconry and it was vacant
 1907–1932: Obadiah Newnham
 –2016: Patricia Drummond (formerly at New Bandon and subsequently at Woodstock)  
 2017–2020: Wandlyn Snelgrove (formerly served as priest in Sussex)
 2020–present: Kevin Stockall

Archdeacons of Kingston and the Kennebecasis
 2002-2006: Richard McConnell
 2006-2015: David Barrett
 2015–present: Robert MarshArchdeacons of Moncton 2006-2014 Richard McConnell
 2014–present: Brent HamArchdeacons of Saint John 2016–2017: Stuart Allan
 2018–2022: Keith Osborne
 2022-present: Leo MartinArchdeacons of Woodstock 2014–2017: Patricia Drummond (acting)
 2018–2020: Roderick BlackDiocesan Archdeacons'''
 ?-2000: Harold Hazen
 1998-2003: Claude Miller
 2003-2014: Geoffrey Hall
 2014-present: Cathy Laskey

See also
Dean of Fredericton

References

 
Fredericton, Anglican Diocese of
Anglican church buildings in New Brunswick
Organizations based in Fredericton
Anglican Province of Canada